Aghavnadzor may refer to:
Aghavnadzor, Kotayk, Armenia
Aghavnadzor, Vayots Dzor, Armenia